The Film Independent's Spirit Award for Best Director is one of the annual Independent Spirit Awards.

History
It was first presented in 1985 with Joel Coen and Martin Scorsese being the first winners of the category for Blood Simple and After Hours, respectively.

Directors Barry Jenkins, Tom McCarthy, Joel Coen and Alexander Payne are the only winners who have received this award more than once, with two wins each. Tom Haynes holds the record of most nominations with six, followed by Gus Van Sant with five. Martha Coolidge was the first female director to win the award, receiving it in 1991.

Winners and nominees

1980s

1990s

2000s

2010s

2020s

Multiple nominations (3 or more)
Todd Haynes: 6
Gus van Sant: 5
Ang Lee: 4
Alexander Payne: 4
Joel Coen: 3 (one with Ethan Coen)
Richard Linklater: 3
Jeff Nichols: 3
Paul Schrader: 3
Steven Soderbergh: 3
Oliver Stone: 3

Multiple wins
Barry Jenkins: 2
Tom McCarthy: 2
Joel Coen: 2 (one in a tie with Martin Scorsese)
Alexander Payne: 2

References

D
 
Awards for best director